Cristian Brandi and Federico Mordegan were the defending champions, but did not participate this year.

Yevgeny Kafelnikov and Andrei Olhovskiy won in the final 5–7, 7–5, 6–2, against Marc-Kevin Goellner and Diego Nargiso.

Seeds

  Yevgeny Kafelnikov /  Andrei Olhovskiy (champions)
  David Rikl /  Karel Nováček (first round)
  Sergio Casal /  Emilio Sánchez (semifinals)
  Tom Nijssen /  Menno Oosting (first round)

Draw

Draw

External links
Draw

Portugal Open
1995 ATP Tour
Estoril Open